The 1896 Haskell Indians football team was an American football team that represented the Haskell Indian Institute (now known as Haskell Indian Nations University) as an independent during the 1896 college football season. The team compiled a 0–4 record. No record has been found identifying a coach for the team during the regular season, but they were coached during the pre-season by former Kansas player Arthur Huddleston.

Schedule

References

Haskell
Haskell Indian Nations Fighting Indians football seasons
College football winless seasons
Haskell Indians football